Hippocratea is a genus of flowering plants in the family Celastraceae, usually lianas, native to tropical and subtropical North America, South America and Africa.

Species
Currently accepted species include:

Hippocratea myriantha Oliv.
Hippocratea pauciflora Rose
Hippocratea stuhlmanniana Loes.
Hippocratea vignei Hoyle
Hippocratea volubilis L.

A large number of species names have been previously associated with Hippocratea.

Hippocratea acapulcensis Kunth
Hippocratea acuminata Hoffmanns. ex Link
Hippocratea acutiflora DC.
Hippocratea adolphi-friderici Harms
Hippocratea affinis De Wild. [Illegitimate]
Hippocratea affinis Cambess.
Hippocratea africana (Willd.) Loes. ex Engl.
Hippocratea africana var. richardiana (Cambess.) N.Robson
Hippocratea aggregata Peyr.
Hippocratea ambigua Peyr.
Hippocratea anafensis Urb.
Hippocratea andamanica King
Hippocratea andina (Miers) J.F.Macbr.
Hippocratea andongensis Welw. ex Oliv.
Hippocratea angulata Griff.
Hippocratea angustipetala H. Perrier
Hippocratea anthodon Pers.
Hippocratea antunesii Loes. ex Harms
Hippocratea apiculata Welw. ex Oliv.
Hippocratea apocynoides Welw. ex Oliv.
Hippocratea apocynoides subsp. guineensis (Hutch. & M.B.Moss) N.Robson
Hippocratea aptera Loes. ex Harms
Hippocratea arborea Roxb.
Hippocratea arnottiana Wight
Hippocratea aspera Lam.
Hippocratea aubletiana Miers
Hippocratea austin-smithii Lundell
Hippocratea bakeri H. Perrier
Hippocratea barbata F.Muell.
Hippocratea beccarii Tuyn
Hippocratea bequaertii De Wild.
Hippocratea bilobicarpa Miers
Hippocratea bipindensis Loes. ex Fritsch
Hippocratea boinensis H. Perrier
Hippocratea bojeri Tul.
Hippocratea bojeri var. hildebrandtii Loes.
Hippocratea bojeri var. malifolia (Baker) H. Perrier
Hippocratea bonplandiana Peyr.
Hippocratea bourdillenii Gamble
Hippocratea brachystachys Ridl.
Hippocratea bruneelii De Wild.
Hippocratea buchananii Loes.
Hippocratea buchholzii Loes.
Hippocratea busseana Loes.
Hippocratea cambodiana Pierre
Hippocratea camerunica Loes.
Hippocratea campestris Peyr.
Hippocratea caribaea Urb.
Hippocratea cassinoides DC.
Hippocratea cearensis Miers
Hippocratea celastroides Kunth
Hippocratea chariensis A. Chev.
Hippocratea chesseana Pierre
Hippocratea chevalieri Hutch. & M.B.Moss
Hippocratea chiapensis Standl.
Hippocratea clematoidea Loes. ex De Wild.
Hippocratea clematoides Loes.
Hippocratea comosa Sw.
Hippocratea copiosiflora Miers
Hippocratea coriacea Wright ex Griseb.
Hippocratea crenata K. Schum. & Loes.
Hippocratea crinita Pittier
Hippocratea cubana Urb.
Hippocratea cumingii M.A.Lawson
Hippocratea cymosa De Wild. & T.Durand
Hippocratea cymosa var. togoensis Loes.
Hippocratea decussata (Ruiz & Pav.) Peyr.
Hippocratea decussata var. communis Peyr.
Hippocratea decussata var. lanceolata Peyr.
Hippocratea decussata var. parviflora Loes.
Hippocratea delagoensis Loes.
Hippocratea dewildemaniana (N.Hallé) J.B.Hall
Hippocratea diffusa Miers
Hippocratea diffusiflora (Miers) Loes.
Hippocratea ding-houi Chakrab. & M.Gangop.
Hippocratea dinhensis Pierre
Hippocratea discolor G. Mey.
Hippocratea disperma Vahl
Hippocratea disperma Wall.
Hippocratea divaricata Miers
Hippocratea domingensis Urb. & Ekman
Hippocratea elliptica Kunth
Hippocratea ellipticarpa Merr.
Hippocratea emarginata Rudge
Hippocratea euonymoides Vahl
Hippocratea evonymoides Tul.
Hippocratea excelsa Kunth
Hippocratea ferruginea King
Hippocratea festiva Miers
Hippocratea fimbriata Exell
Hippocratea flaccida Peyr.
Hippocratea flava Gleason
Hippocratea floribunda Benth.
Hippocratea foliosa Rusby
Hippocratea fuscescens Kurz
Hippocratea glaga Korth.
Hippocratea goetzei Loes.
Hippocratea gossweileri Exell
Hippocratea graciliflora Welw. ex Oliv.
Hippocratea graciliflora subsp. newalensis Blakelock
Hippocratea grahamii Wight
Hippocratea granadensis (Miers) Peyr.
Hippocratea grandiflora Wall.
Hippocratea grandiflora Payer
Hippocratea grisebachii Loes.
Hippocratea grisebachii var. parvifolia Chodat & Hassl.
Hippocratea guineensis Hutch. & M.B.Moss
Hippocratea hasseltiana Miq.
Hippocratea hideabraandtii Loesner
Hippocratea hierniana Exell & Mendonça
Hippocratea hilariana Miers
Hippocratea hirtiuscula Dunkley
Hippocratea holdeniana A.C. Sm.
Hippocratea holtzii Loes. ex Harms
Hippocratea huanucana Loes.
Hippocratea indica Willd.
Hippocratea indica var. parviflora (N.E. Br.) N.E. Br.
Hippocratea infuscata Miers
Hippocratea integrifolia A. Rich.
Hippocratea inundata Mart. ex Peyr.
Hippocratea iotricha Loes. ex Fritsch
Hippocratea isangiensis De Wild.
Hippocratea kageraensis Loes. in Mildbr.
Hippocratea kaimlecta Loes. ex Harms
Hippocratea kappleriana Miq.
Hippocratea kennedyi Hoyle
Hippocratea kirkii Oliv.
Hippocratea laevigata Vahl
Hippocratea lanceolata Buch.-Ham. ex Wall.
Hippocratea lancifolia Lundell
Hippocratea lasiandra Loes. ex Harms
Hippocratea lawsonii Elmer
Hippocratea lepida (Miers) Miers ex Peyr.
Hippocratea lindenii Urb.
Hippocratea loandensis Exell
Hippocratea lobbii M.A.Lawson
Hippocratea loesneriana Hutch. & M.B.Moss
Hippocratea lonchophylla Miers
Hippocratea longipes Oliv.
Hippocratea longipetiolata Oliv.
Hippocratea lutea Gleason
Hippocratea luteoviridis Exell
Hippocratea macrantha Korth.
Hippocratea macrophylla Vahl
Hippocratea madagascariensis Lam.
Hippocratea maingayi M.A.Lawson
Hippocratea majumdarii Chakrab. & M.Gangop.
Hippocratea malifolia Baker
Hippocratea malpighiifolia Rudge
Hippocratea martii Hassl.
Hippocratea megacarpa Peyr.
Hippocratea megalocarpa Merr.
Hippocratea meizantha S.F. Blake
Hippocratea menyharthii Schinz
Hippocratea mexicana Miers
Hippocratea micrantha Cambess.
Hippocratea miersii Loes.
Hippocratea minimiflora H. Perrier
Hippocratea mitchellae I.M.Johnst.
Hippocratea molunduina Loes. ex Harms
Hippocratea mucronata Exell
Hippocratea multiflora Lam.
Hippocratea nervosa (Miers) J.F.Macbr.
Hippocratea nicobarica Kurz
Hippocratea nigricaulis Ridl.
Hippocratea nitida Oberm.
Hippocratea obcordata Lam.
Hippocratea oblongata Sol. ex Miers
Hippocratea obovata Rich.
Hippocratea obtusa Ridl.
Hippocratea obtusifolia sensu Oliv.
Hippocratea obtusifolia var. barbata (F.Muell.) Benth.
Hippocratea obtusifolia var. fischerana Loes.
Hippocratea obtusifolia var. richardiana (Cambess.) Loes.
Hippocratea odorata De Wild.
Hippocratea oliveriana Hutch. & M.B.Moss
Hippocratea opacifolia J.F.Macbr.
Hippocratea ovalifolia Miers
Hippocratea ovata Lam.
Hippocratea ovata var. crassifolia Peyr.
Hippocratea ovata var. grandiflora Peyr.
Hippocratea ovata var. latibarbis Peyr.
Hippocratea ovata f. multiflora Peyr.
Hippocratea ovata var. oblongifolia DC.
Hippocratea ovata var. serrulata Peyr.
Hippocratea pachnocarpa Loes. ex Fritsch
Hippocratea pachyphylla Urb.
Hippocratea pallens Planch. ex Oliv.
Hippocratea pallida Craib
Hippocratea pallidula Miers
Hippocratea paniculata Vahl
Hippocratea paniculata (Mart.) Hassl. [Illegitimate]
Hippocratea parkinsonii Chakrab. & M.Gangop.
Hippocratea parviflora N.E.Br.
Hippocratea parvifolia Oliv.
Hippocratea pentandra Griff.
Hippocratea pereskia Steud.
Hippocratea perspicua Miers
Hippocratea plumbea Blakelock & R.Wilczek
Hippocratea plumieri Miers
Hippocratea poggei Loes.
Hippocratea polyantha Loes.
Hippocratea preussii Loes.
Hippocratea puberula Craib
Hippocratea pygmaeantha Loes. ex Harms
Hippocratea pynaerti De Wild.
Hippocratea richardiana Cambess.
Hippocratea riedeliana Peyr.
Hippocratea rigida Span.
Hippocratea rigida Hampe ex M.A.Lawson
Hippocratea ritschardii (R.Wilczek) N.Robson
Hippocratea rotundifolia Hook.f.
Hippocratea rovirosae Standl.
Hippocratea rowlandii Loes.
Hippocratea rubiginosa H. Perrier
Hippocratea salacioides Korth.
Hippocratea scandens Jacq.
Hippocratea scheffleri Loes.
Hippocratea schimperiana Hochst. & Steud.
Hippocratea schlechteri Loes.
Hippocratea schomburgkii Klotzsch ex Peyr.
Hippocratea scutellata Griseb.
Hippocratea seleriana Loes.
Hippocratea semlikiensis Robyns & Tournay
Hippocratea senegalensis Lam.
Hippocratea senegalensis var. madagascariensis (Lam.) Poir.
Hippocratea serrata Griff.
Hippocratea serrulata Ettingsh.
Hippocratea setulifera Hemsl. ex Pittier
Hippocratea sogerensis Baker f.
Hippocratea staudtii Loes.
Hippocratea subintegra S.F.Blake
Hippocratea sulcata Craib
Hippocratea swartziana Miers
Hippocratea tabascensis Lundell
Hippocratea tenuiflora Mart. ex Peyr.
Hippocratea tenuiflora f. angustifolia Hassl.
Hippocratea tenuiflora var. grisebachii (Loes.) Hassl.
Hippocratea tetramera H. Perrier
Hippocratea thomasii Hutch. & M.B.Moss
Hippocratea timorensis Span.
Hippocratea tortuosa Wall.
Hippocratea trichopetala Merr.
Hippocratea trilobulata Ridl.
Hippocratea tulasnei Drake
Hippocratea ulei Loes.
Hippocratea unguiculata Loes.
Hippocratea uniflora Moc. & Sessé ex DC.
Hippocratea urceolus Tul.
Hippocratea utilis Rose
Hippocratea vahliana Miers
Hippocratea velutina Afzel.
Hippocratea venulosa Hutch. & M.B.Moss
Hippocratea verdickii De Wild.
Hippocratea verrucosa Kunth
Hippocratea verrucosa Griseb. [Illegitimate]
Hippocratea versicolor Miers
Hippocratea verticillata Steud.
Hippocratea verticillata var. madagascariensis (Lam.) Pers.
Hippocratea viridis Ruiz & Pav.
Hippocratea volkensii Loes.
Hippocratea volkii Suess.
Hippocratea warmingii Peyr. ex Fritsch [Invalid]
Hippocratea welwitschii Oliv.
Hippocratea wrightiana (Miers) Urb.
Hippocratea yaundina Loes.
Hippocratea yucatanensis Standl.
Hippocratea yunnanensis Hu
Hippocratea zenkeri Loes.
Hippocratea zippeliana Miq.

References

Celastraceae
Celastrales genera